The Jupiter Icy Moons Explorer (JUICE) is an interplanetary spacecraft in development by the European Space Agency (ESA) with Airbus Defence and Space as the main contractor. The mission will study three of Jupiter's Galilean moons: Ganymede, Callisto, and Europa (excluding the volcanically active Io; Io is not an icy moon) all of which are thought to have significant bodies of liquid water beneath their surfaces, making them potentially habitable environments.

The spacecraft is scheduled to launch on 13 April 2023 and will reach Jupiter in July 2031 after four gravity assists and eight years of travel. In December 2034, the spacecraft will enter orbit around Ganymede for its close up science mission, becoming the first spacecraft to orbit a moon other than the Moon of Earth. The selection of this mission for the L1 launch slot of ESA's Cosmic Vision science programme was announced on 2 May 2012. Its period of operations will overlap with NASA's Europa Clipper mission, launching in 2024.

History 

The mission started as a reformulation of the Jupiter Ganymede Orbiter proposal, which was to be ESA's component of the cancelled Europa Jupiter System Mission – Laplace (EJSM-Laplace). It became a candidate for the first L-class mission (L1) of the ESA Cosmic Vision Programme, and its selection was announced on 2 May 2012.

In April 2012, JUICE was recommended over the proposed Advanced Telescope for High Energy Astrophysics (ATHENA) X-ray telescope and a gravitational wave observatory (New Gravitational wave Observatory (NGO)).

In July 2015, Airbus Defence and Space was selected as the prime contractor to design and build the probe, to be assembled in Toulouse, France.

Timeline

Launch and trajectory 
JUICE will be launched on 13 April 2023 on an Ariane 5 launch vehicle from the Guiana Space Centre. Following the launch, there will be multiple planned gravity assists to put JUICE on a trajectory to Jupiter: a flyby of the Earth–Moon system in August 2024, Venus in August 2025, second flyby of Earth in September 2026, and a final third flyby of Earth in January 2029.

JUICE will pass through the asteroid belt twice. A flyby of the asteroid 223 Rosa has been proposed, and would occur in October 2029.

Arrival at the Jovian system 
When it arrives in Jupiter's system in July 2031, JUICE will first perform a flyby of Ganymede in preparation for Jupiter orbital insertion ≈ 7.5 hours later. The first orbit will be elongated, with subsequent orbits gradually lowered over time, resulting in a circular orbit around Jupiter.

The first Europa flyby will take place in July 2032. JUICE will enter a high inclination orbit to allow exploration of Jupiter's polar regions and to study Jupiter's magnetosphere.

Orbital insertion on Ganymede 
In December 2034, JUICE will enter an elliptical orbit around Ganymede, becoming the first spacecraft to orbit a moon other than Earth's Moon. JUICE will study Ganymede's composition and magnetosphere among other things.

Planned deorbit on Ganymede 
When the spacecraft consumes its remaining propellant, JUICE is planned to be deorbited and impact Ganymede at the end of 2035.

Science objectives 

The JUICE orbiter will perform detailed investigations on Ganymede and evaluate its potential to support life. Investigations of Europa and Callisto will complete a comparative picture of these Galilean moons. The three moons are thought to harbour internal liquid water oceans, and so are central to understanding the habitability of icy worlds.

The main science objectives for Ganymede, and to a lesser extent for Callisto, are:

 Characterisation of the ocean layers and detection of putative subsurface water reservoirs
 Topographical, geological and compositional mapping of the surface
 Study of the physical properties of the icy crusts
 Characterisation of the internal mass distribution, dynamics and evolution of the interiors
 Investigation of Ganymede's tenuous atmosphere
 Study of Ganymede's intrinsic magnetic field and its interactions with the Jovian magnetosphere.

For Europa, the focus is on the chemistry essential to life, including organic molecules, and on understanding the formation of surface features and the composition of the non-water-ice material. Furthermore, JUICE will provide the first subsurface sounding of the moon, including the first determination of the minimal thickness of the icy crust over the most recently active regions.

More distant spatially resolved observations will also be carried out for several minor irregular satellites and the volcanically active moon Io.

Spacecraft

Design drivers 
The main spacecraft design drivers are related to the large distance to the Sun, the use of solar power, and Jupiter's harsh radiation environment.

Gravity assists include:

 Interplanetary transfer (Earth, Venus, Earth, Mars, Earth)
 Jupiter orbit insertion and apocentre reduction with multiple Ganymede gravity assists
 Reduction of velocity with Ganymede–Callisto assists
 Increase inclination with 10–12 Callisto gravity assists

Science instruments 

On 21 February 2013, after a competition, 11 science instruments were selected by ESA, which are being developed by science and engineering teams from all over Europe, with participation from the US.Japan will also contribute several components for SWI, RPWI, GALA, PEP, JANUS and J-MAG instruments, and will facilitate testing.

Jovis, Amorum ac Natorum Undique Scrutator (JANUS) 

The name is Latin for "comprehensive observation of Jupiter, his love affairs and descendants." A camera system to image Ganymede and interesting parts of the surface of Callisto at better than 400 m/pixel (resolution limited by mission data volume). Selected targets will be investigated in high-resolution with a spatial resolution from 25 m/pixel down to 2.4 m/pixel with a 1.3° field of view. The camera system has 13 panchromatic, broad and narrow-band filters in the 0.36 µm to 1.1 µm range, and provides stereo imaging capabilities. JANUS will also allow relating spectral, laser and radar measurements to geomorphology and thus will provide the overall geological context.

Moons and Jupiter Imaging Spectrometer (MAJIS) 
A visible and infrared imaging spectrograph operating from 400 nm to 5.70 µm, with spectral resolution of 3–7 nm, that will observe tropospheric cloud features and minor gas species on Jupiter and will investigate the composition of ices and minerals on the surfaces of the icy moons.

UV Imaging Spectrograph (UVS) 
An imaging spectrograph operating in the wavelength range 55–210 nm with spectral resolution of <0.6 nm that will characterise exospheres and aurorae of the icy moons, including plume searches on Europa, and study the Jovian upper atmosphere and aurorae. Resolution up to  observing Ganymede and up to  observing Jupiter.

Sub-millimeter Wave Instrument (SWI) 
A spectrometer using a  antenna and working in 1080–1275 GHz and 530–601 GHz with spectral resolving power of ~107 that will study Jupiter's stratosphere and troposphere, and the exospheres and surfaces of the icy moons.

Ganymede Laser Altimeter (GALA) 
A laser altimeter with a  spot size and  vertical resolution at  intended for studying topography of icy moons and tidal deformations of Ganymede.

Radar for Icy Moons Exploration (RIME) 

JUICE-Magnetometer (J-MAG) 

Will study the subsurface oceans of the icy moons and the interaction of Jovian magnetic field with the magnetic field of Ganymede using a sensitive magnetometer.
  
  Space Research Institute (IWF-OEAW) Graz, Austria. Technical University Braunschweig, Germany.

Particle Environment Package (PEP) 
A suite of six sensors to study the magnetosphere of Jupiter and its interactions with the Jovian moons. PEP will measure positive and negative ions, electrons, exospheric neutral gas, thermal plasma and energetic neutral atoms present in all domains of the Jupiter system from 1 meV to 1 MeV energy.

Radio and Plasma Wave Investigation (RPWI) 
Will characterise the plasma environment and radio emissions around the spacecraft, it is composed of four experiments: GANDALF, MIME, FRODO and JENRAGE. RPWI will use four Langmuir probes, each one mounted at the end of its own dedicated boom, and sensitive up to 1.6 MHz to characterize plasma and receivers in the frequency range 80 kHz to 45 MHz to measure radio emissions. This scientific instrument is somewhat notable for using Sonic as part of its logo.

Gravity and Geophysics of Jupiter and Galilean Moons (3GM) 
3GM is a radio science package comprising a Ka transponder and an ultrastable oscillator. 3GM will be used to study the gravity field – up to degree 10 – at Ganymede and the extent of internal oceans on the icy moons, and to investigate the structure of the neutral atmospheres and ionospheres of Jupiter (0.1 – 800 mbar) and its moons.

Planetary Radio Interferometer and Doppler Experiment (PRIDE) 
The experiment will generate specific signals transmitted by JUICE's antenna and received by very-long-baseline interferometry to perform precision measurements of the gravity fields of Jupiter and its icy moons.

Targets 
The craft will encounter two planets and the Moon before arriving at Jupiter.

See also 

 Exploration of Jupiter
 
 Galileo – former Jupiter orbiter
 Juno – current Jupiter orbiter
 Jupiter flybys: Pioneer 10 / 11; Voyager 1 / 2; Ulysses; Cassini–Huygens; New Horizons

References

External links 

 ESA's JUICE page
 Future Planetary Exploration JUICE – Jupiter Ganymede Orbiter Revised Proposal
 Jupiter Icy Moons Explorer (2011) (OPAG October 2011 Presentations)
 JUICE (JUpiter ICy moons Explorer) (OPAG March 2012 Presentations)
 JUICE-JAPAN – JAXA
 JUICE – NASA
 JUICE article on eoPortal by ESA

Solar System Exploration program
European Space Agency space probes
Proposed space probes
Missions to Jupiter
Orbiters (space probe)
Cosmic Vision
2023 in spaceflight